Louis Steven Fabrice Coiffic is a Mauritian sprinter specializing in the 100 metres and 200 metres, who competed in the 2006 Commonwealth Games and 2006 African Championships in Athletics. Coiffic is the third fastest 200m sprinter in Mauritius with a time of 20.89 seconds behind Stephan Buckland's 20.06 seconds and Eric Milazar's 20.66 seconds achieved respectively in Paris, France and La Chaux-de-Fonds, Switzerland.

Fabrice Coiffic's rise to prominence in Mauritian athletics came in 2006 when he reached the final of the 200m at the 2006 African Championships in Athletics where he finished in fifth place. That same year, he participated at the 2006 Commonwealth Games where he reached the quarter final in the 200m race and achieving a new personal best of 20.99. In 2007, Coiffic became the second athlete after Stephan Buckland to win the 100m, the 200m and 4 × 100 m relay events at the Indian Ocean Island Games also known as the Jeux des Iles de L'ocean Indien, held in Antananarivo, Madagascar.

In 2008, Coiffic failed to reach the finals of the 100m and 200m at the African Athletics Championships held in Adds Ababa, Ethiopia. In 2009, Coiffic participated at the Francophone Games in Beirut, Lebanon where he came fourth the 200m final in a time of 20.99. He also won a silver medal with the Mauritian relay team in 39.60 seconds. Earlier that year, he achieved a personal best time 20.89 seconds at the Resisprint International Meeting in Switzerland thus making him the third fastest Mauritian sprinter in the half lap event. Furthermore, Coiffic achieved his personal best in the 100m event with a time of 10.45 which he ran on home soil at the Mauritian International Meeting. He ran 10.45 again at the Meeting National D2 Groupama Argentan in France.

In 2010, Coiffic participated at the 2010 African Championships in Athletics in Nairobi, Kenya, where he only reached the semifinal in both the 100m and 200m events with a time of 10.51 and 21.43. This poor performance was repeated at the 2010 Commonwealth Games in Delhi, India where the sprinter only reached the quarter final of the 200m in 21.19 seconds and also being eliminated in the first rounds of the 4 × 100 m relay. With the retirement of Stephan Buckland in July 2010, Coiffic was thought to be the sprinter who would put Mauritian back at the international level but has disappointed many Mauritians due to his poor performances at the 2010 African Championships in Athletics and the 2010 Commonwealth Games.

However, in 2011, Coiffic impressed many with his winning streak of three gold medals at the 2011 Indian Ocean Island Games, held in Mahe, Seychelles. At these games, Coiffic easily won the 100m in 10.59, the 200m in 21.19 and the 4 × 100 m relay in 40.49 thus, repeating his performance that he achieved four years ago in the 2007 Games. This makes him the only athlete in the history of the Games to win all three events two times consecutively. He thought of attempting to break the Games' record in the 200m which is 20.46 and was achieved in 2003 by Stephan Buckland, but that seemed to be too farfetched as he would have had to run close to his personal best of 20.89. Earlier in 2011 Coiffic participated in many athletics meetings in France where he took mostly second and third places in sprint events. His 2011 season best in the 100m is currently 10.58 seconds, a time he achieved at the Meeting National D1 Nant'Haies Atlantic in France, where he won the race.

Personal Bests

Achievements in Athletics

References

External links
 

Living people
Mauritian male sprinters
Place of birth missing (living people)
Athletes (track and field) at the 2012 Summer Olympics
Olympic athletes of Mauritius
1984 births
Athletes (track and field) at the 2006 Commonwealth Games
Athletes (track and field) at the 2010 Commonwealth Games
Commonwealth Games competitors for Mauritius